Acanthodica fosteri is a moth of the family Noctuidae first described by George Hampson in 1913. It is found in South America, including Paraguay, French Guiana and Costa Rica.

References

Catocalina
Moths described in 1913
Moths of South America